The Hillston News was a weekly English language newspaper published in Hillston, New South Wales, Australia.

Newspaper history 
The full masthead for the first issue of The Hillston News was The Hillston News and Euabalong, Lake Cudgellico, Booligal, Mossgiel, and Ivanhoe Advertiser. It was published Saturday 4 November 1882. The title then changed to include Mount Hope and became The Hillston News and Mount Hope, Euabalong, Lake Cudgellico, Booligal, Mossgiel, and Ivanhoe Advertiser. The final issue, ten months later, was published Saturday 8 September 1883. The proprietor was George Bridle.

Digitisation 
The Hillston News has been digitised as part of the Australian Newspapers Digitisation Program of the National Library of Australia.

See also 
 List of newspapers in Australia
 List of newspapers in New South Wales

References

External links 
 

Defunct newspapers published in New South Wales
Newspapers on Trove